Giuseppe Rosi (Calcara di Ussita, 8 January 1798 – Roma, 9 March 1891) was an Italian poet and patriot known as "Poeta Pastore".

Life 
Born in Ussita to a family of farmers, he was nicknamed "poet pastor" (poeta-pastore). After an initial enthusiasm towards Pope Pius IX for whom he composed the piece "Oh Italia, Italia, dolce suol natìo" and after being disappointed by him, Rosi adhered to the ideals of the Italian Risorgimento.

Beginning in 1821, he was an adherent of the Carboneria; later he joined the Giovane Italia of Giuseppe Mazzini in 1831, and actively participated in the revolutions of 1848, of 1859 and of 1870. He was named captain of the Stato Maggiore by Giuseppe Garibaldi during the Second Roman Republic, as shown by two letters from Garibaldi himself (29 February and 29 March 1849), of whom he became a close friend. After the fall of the Republic, Rosi was captured by the authorities and remained for three years in jail. He was later imprisoned again, after his new involvement in the activism for the Italian unification. He was with Garibaldi again in 1867, and after the capture of Rome in 1870 he finally moved to Rome, where he lived until his death.

He was portrayed in a statue by Giuseppe Mangionello placed on the Gianicolo in Rome in 1912, and in another statue in a street in his native town.

Bibliography 

 Giuseppe Rosi, Vita e poesie politiche di Giuseppe Rosi, detto il Poeta Pastore,  E. Mantegazza, Roma, 1912

Notes

References 

 Giuseppe Garibaldi, Edizione nazionale degli scritti di Giuseppe Garibaldi, Vol. 2. Cappelli, 1932.
 Francesco Protonotari, Nuova antologia, Vol. 245, Direzione della Nuova Antologia, 1912.
 Guido Mazzoni, L'ottocento, Vol. 9, 1934.
 Raffaele Giovagnoli, Ciceruacchio e Don Pirlone: Ricordi storici della rivoluzione romana dal 1846 al 1849, Roma, Forzani e c. tipografi del Senato, 1894.

External links 
 Prefettura.it: I luoghi della memoria

1891 deaths
Italian people of the Italian unification
Italian poets
1798 births